Fetish Bones is the debut studio album by American musician Moor Mother. It was released via Don Giovanni Records on September 16, 2016.

Critical reception

The album was included on Pitchforks "20 Best Experimental Albums of 2016" list. It was also placed at number 18 on Rolling Stones "20 Best Avant Albums of 2016" list, number 3 on The Wires "Top 50 Releases of 2016" list, and number 2 on Bandcamp Dailys "Best Albums of 2016" list.

The song "Creation Myth" was placed at number 88 on Spins "101 Best Songs of 2016" list. The song "Deadbeat Protest" was placed at number 98 on Pitchforks "100 Best Songs of 2016" list, as well as number 24 on Noiseys "100 Best Songs of 2016" list.

Track listing

Personnel
Credits adapted from liner notes.

 Moor Mother – production (1, 3, 5, 6, 7, 8, 10, 11, 12), words, vocals, recording, insert
 Ohbliv – production (2)
 Trngnder – production (4)
 Drums Like Machine Guns – production (9)
 Wizard Apprentice – production (13)
 Joe Baldacci – mixing
 Alex Nagel – mastering
 Sasha Burgess – cover photography
 Eva Wo – back cover
 Joe Steinhardt – layout

References

External links
 

2016 debut albums
Moor Mother albums
Don Giovanni Records albums